Iliafi Talotusitusi Esera  is a Christian minister of the Assemblies of God movement.

Pastor Iliafi is an internationally renowned speaker amongst Christian organizations.
Reverend Esera is of Samoan birth and currently resides in New Zealand, but regularly speaks in America, Asia and Oceania.
He is a member of the Assembly of God in New Zealand Executive Presbytery and holds the positions of General Superintendent of the Assemblies of God in New Zealand. He also held the position of Assistant Superintendent of the AGNZ from 2003 until his election to General Superintendent in November 2011. Iliafi is the senior pastor of Faith City Church in Wanganui, New Zealand.

Reverend Esera is of Samoan birth and married to Falefia-o-alii (called Fia), they have eight children and 11 grandchildren.

Iliafi ministers at conferences all over the world including Promise Keepers NZ & Youth of the Nation in Whanganui.

In the 2021 Queen's Birthday Honours, Esera was appointed an Officer of the New Zealand Order of Merit, for services to the Samoan community and Christian ministry.

References

External links
Faith City Church, NZ
Assemblies of God in NZ

|-

|-

Samoan Assemblies of God pastors
New Zealand Pentecostals
New Zealand Assemblies of God pastors
Living people
Year of birth missing (living people)
Officers of the New Zealand Order of Merit